Mal Assembly constituency is an assembly constituency in Jalpaiguri district in the Indian state of West Bengal. It is reserved for scheduled tribes.

Overview
As per orders of the Delimitation Commission, No. 20 Mal Assembly constituency  covers Mal municipality and Mal community development block,

Mal Assembly constituency is part of No. 3 Jalpaiguri (Lok Sabha constituency) (SC).

Members of Legislative Assembly

Election Results

2021
In the 2021 elections, Bulu Chik Baraik of Trinamool Congress defeated his nearest rival, Mahesh Bagey of BJP.

2016
In the 2016 elections, Bulu Chik Baraik of Trinamool Congress defeated his nearest rival, Augustus Kerketta of CPI (M).

2011
In the 2011 elections, Bulu Chik Baraik of CPI(M) defeated his nearest rival, Hiramoni Oraon of Congress.

.# Swing calculated on Congress+Trinamool Congress vote percentages taken together in 2006. JMM did not contest the seat in 2006.

1977-2006
In the 2006 and 2001 state assembly elections, Somra Lakra of CPI(M) won the Mal (ST) assembly seat defeating his nearest rivals Turi Kol Munda and Shyam Bhagat, both of Congress, respectively. Contests in most years were multi cornered but only winners and runners are being mentioned. Jagannath Oraon of CPI(M) defeated Turi Kule Munda and Shyam Bhagat, both of Congress, in 1996 and 1991. Mohanlal Oraon of CPI(M) defeated Aao Kalndi of Congress in 1987, Suman Tirkey of Congress in 1982 and Antani Topno of Congress in 1977.

1957–1972
Antoni Topno of Congress won in 1972, 1971, 1969 and 1967. Barendra Krishna Bhowmick of Congress won in 1962. In 1957, Mal was a joint seat. Mangru Bhagat of CPI and Budhu Bhagat of Congress, won. In independent India's first election in 1951, Sasadhar Kar and Munda Antoni Topno, both of Congress, won the Western Duars seat.

References

Assembly constituencies of West Bengal
Politics of Jalpaiguri district
Year of establishment missing